Urszula Antoniak (born 1968 in Częstochowa, Poland) is a Polish-Dutch film director. She is best known for her film Nothing Personal which won four Golden calves.

Biography
Antoniak graduated from the Krzysztof Kieślowski Film School in Katowice and the Netherlands Film Academy in Amsterdam.

Selected filmography 
 2009: Nothing Personal
 2011: Code Blue
 2014: Nude Area
 2017: Beyond Words
 2020: Magic Mountains

References

External links 
 
 Urszula Antoniak - Filmography at the Filmpolski Database 

1968 births
Living people
Krzysztof Kieślowski Film School alumni
Dutch women film directors
Polish women film directors
Golden Calf winners
Polish emigrants to the Netherlands
People from Częstochowa
University of Silesia in Katowice alumni